The WDM Radio Awards is an award ceremony created in 2017 by Los 40 under their World Dance Music brand, billed as "the first radio awards to electronic music". It is meant to be a global event, promoted by the twelve Los 40 stations in Spain and Latin America.

Editions

1st edition (2017)
The first edition was held on March 29, 2017 at Estadio Azteca in Mexico City, Mexico.

Awards and nominations
Winners indicated in bold.
Best DJ
 The Chainsmokers
 DJ Snake
 David Guetta
 Martin Garrix
 Diplo

Best Electro House DJ
 Axwell Λ Ingrosso
 Galantis
 Don Diablo
 David Guetta
 Zedd

Best Party DJ
 Steve Aoki
 Nervo
 Martin Garrix
 Skrillex
 Dimitri Vegas & Like Mike

King of Social Media
 Diplo
 Skrillex
 Steve Aoki
 Calvin Harris
 Martin Garrix

Best Global Track
 The Chainsmokers feat. Halsey - Closer
 Major Lazer feat. Justin Bieber & MØ - Cold Water
 Calvin Harris feat. Rihanna - This Is What You Came For
 David Guetta feat. Zara Larsson - This One's for You
 Martin Garrix & Bebe Rexha - In the Name of Love

Best Documentary EDM
 Hardwell - I Am Hardwell - Living the Dream
 Steve Aoki - I'll Sleep When I'm Dead
 Zedd - True Colors
 Tomorrowland - This Was Tomorrow
 Space Ibiza - 27 Years of Clubbing History

Best Trending Track
 Flume feat. Kai - Never be Like You
 The Chainsmokers feat. Daya - Don't Let Me Down
 Skrillex & Diplo feat. Kai - Mind
 Marshmello - Alone
 DJ Snake feat. Bipolar Sunshine - Middle

Best New Talent
 Kungs
 Kygo
 Lost Frequencies
 Marshmello
 Alan Walker

Best Remix
 Seeb - I Took a Pill in Ibiza by Mike Posner
 Don Diablo - Keeping Your Head Up by Birdy
 Tiësto - Dancing on My Own by Calum Scott
 Robin Schulz - I Was Wrong by Arizona
 Filatov & Karas - Don't Be So Shy by Imany

Best Electronic Vocalist
 Vassy
 Daya
 Jake Reese
 MØ
 Conrad Sewell

Best Dancefloor Track
 Deorro feat. Elvis Crespo - Bailar
 Galantis - No Money
 Major Lazer feat. Nyla & Fuse ODG - Light It Up
 Kungs vs Cookin' on 3 Burners - This Girl
 Tujamo - Drop That Low

Performers
 David Guetta
 Steve Aoki
 Martin Garrix
 Alan Walker
 Cedric Gervais
 Nervo
 Vassy

2nd edition (2018)
The WDM Radio Awards are slated to return to Estadio Azteca for their second edition on March 21, 2018.

Awards and nominations
Winners indicated in bold.
Best DJ
 Martin Garrix
 Steve Aoki
 Dimitri Vegas & Like Mike
 Hardwell
 The Chainsmokers
 Armin van Buuren

Best Electro House DJ
 Axwell Λ Ingrosso
 Don Diablo
 Tiësto
 DJ Snake
 Galantis
 R3hab

Best Party DJ
 Steve Aoki
 Afrojack
 Galantis
 The Chainsmokers
 Martin Garrix
 Nervo

King of Social Media
 Martin Garrix
 Avicii
 Calvin Harris
 Skrillex
 Tiësto
 David Guetta
 Major Lazer

Best Global Track
 Jonas Blue - Mama
 Clean Bandit feat. Sean Paul and Anne-Marie - Rockabye
 The Chainsmokers & Coldplay - Something Just like This
 Robin Schulz feat. James Blunt - OK
 Kygo & Selena Gomez - It Ain't Me
 Burak Yeter feat. Danelle Sandoval - Tuesday
 Steve Aoki & Louis Tomlinson - Just Hold On

Best Bass Track
 Dimitri Vegas & Like Mike vs David Guetta feat. Kiiara - Complicated
 Zedd & Alessia Cara - Stay
 Marshmello feat. Khalid - Silence
 David Guetta feat. Justin Bieber - 2U
 Martin Garrix & Dua Lipa - Scared to Be Lonely
 Alan Walker feat. Noah Cyrus & Digital Farm Animals - All Falls Down

Best Trending Track
 Dillon Francis feat. Yung Pinch - Hello There
 Tujamo feat. Sorana - One on One
 Nora En Pure - Tears In Your Eyes
 Skrillex & Poo Bear - Would You Ever
 Alesso - Take My Breath Away
 Major Lazer feat. Travis Scott, Camila Cabello & Quavo - Know No Better
 Sofi Tukker feat. Nervo, The Knocks & Alisa Ueno - Best Friend
 Galantis - Rich Boy
 Alan Walker - Tired
 Armin van Buuren feat. Josh Cumbee - Sunny Days
 David Guetta & Afrojack feat. Charli XCX & French Montana - Dirty Sexy Money

Best New Talent
 Jax Jones
 Ofenbach
 Mike Williams
 Bruno Martini
 Cheat Codes
 Yellow Claw

Best Remix
 Alan Walker - Issues by Julia Michaels
 Ryan Riback - Call on Me by Starley
 Don Diablo - Something Just like This by The Chainsmokers & Coldplay
 MOSKA - Mi gente by J Balvin & Willy William
 Sam Feldt - Oceans Away by Arizona
 EDX - How Long by Charlie Puth
 Steve Aoki - The Best by Mangchi

Best Dancefloor Track
 Martin Solveig - All Stars
 Axwell Λ Ingrosso - More than You Know
 Jax Jones feat. Raye - You Don't Know Me
 CamelPhat & Elderbrook - Cola
 Hardwell & Kshmr - Power
 David Tort, Markem & Yas Cepeda - Strangers

Best Electronic Vocalist
 Julia Michaels
 Bebe Rexha
 Dua Lipa
 Ina Wroldsen
 Anne-Marie

Best Deep House DJ
 Nora En Pure
 Kygo
 Lost Frequencies
 Robin Schulz
 EDX

Performers
 Don Diablo
 Jax Jones
 Robin Schulz
 Steve Aoki
 Tujamo

References

Awards established in 2017
Dance music awards